The Islamic Cultural Centre of Quebec City (CCIQ) is an organization dedicated to meeting the spiritual, social and economic needs of the Muslim community residing in Quebec City, Quebec, Canada. Its main place of worship is the Great Mosque of Quebec City (French: La Grande Mosquée de Québec).

History 
The Islamic Cultural Centre of Quebec City was founded in 1985 at Université Laval. Its stated mission is "to work proactively to help the Muslim community grow and flourish spiritually, socially, and economically as well as to provide services that properly consider the specific Muslim identity of its members and promote their integration into Quebec society."

Activities 

The centre offers various services and activities:
Integration conferences.
Quranic school and Arabic classes.
 Celebration of births and marriages.
 Funeral services

Many fundraisings and donations are organized to help anyone in need and especially the Canadian society:
The fundraising on 12 of May 2017 to support the flood victims of Montreal.
Yearly blood donation organized by Héma-Québec.

The centre is also actively engaged in many humanitarian causes.

Each year, the centre opens its doors to everyone, people from different cultures and religions meet and talk to better know each other and to help promote integration.

Great Mosque of Quebec City 
The project of building a large mosque in Sainte-Foy, a suburb of Quebec City, was launched in 2002 by the CCIQ.

In 2009, the CCIQ bought the building located at the corner of Route de l'Église and Chemin Sainte-Foy for $1.4 million. The low rise building at 2877 Chemin Ste-Foy has an area of 12,100 square feet and can accommodate approximately 1,000 people.

The acquisition of a new building by the Muslim community made possible the construction of a Great Mosque and thereby solved the problem of lack of space. The number of Muslims presently residing in Quebec City is estimated at 7,000.

The mosque is located near the Church of Sainte-Foy, built in 1876.

Political positions 
The centre has regularly adopted a stand in the political debate in Quebec. Representatives testified before both the Bélanger-Campeau Commission and the Bouchard-Taylor Commission. In 2011, it also testified in a parliamentary committee in the National Assembly of Quebec against certain aspects of Bill 94 brought forward by the Charest government which governed the requirements to offer public services with uncovered faces.

In 2013, the Centre strongly denounced the draft Quebec Charter of Values introduced by the then governing Parti Québécois in 2013, under Premier Pauline Marois.

Due to some Islamophobic events, the centre increased its security, such as installing many security cameras, increasing cooperation with the local police, etc.

2017 attack 

On January 29, 2017, the mosque was the target of a terrorist attack. The perpetrator Alexandre Bissonnette opened fire on the crowd, killing six people in the mosque and injuring nineteen others. The attack was denounced by the politicians throughout Quebec and Canada and attracted a wave of sympathy all over the world.

See also
 List of mosques in the Americas
 Lists of mosques

References

External links 

  

Organizations based in Quebec City
Mosques in Quebec
Islamic organizations based in Canada
1985 establishments in Quebec
Religion in Quebec City